is a railway station on the Chikuho Main Line and Sasaguri Line operated by JR Kyushu in Keisen, Kaho District, Fukuoka, Japan.

History 
On 1 October 1897, the Chikuho Kogyo Railway, now renamed the Chikuho Railway, merged with the Kyushu Railway. Kyushu Railway undertook the next phase of expansion by extending the track to Keisen, then named Nagao, and establishing it as the new southern terminus on 12 December 1901. After the Kyushu Railway was nationalized on 1 July 1907, Japanese Government Railways (JGR) took over control of the station. On 12 October 1909, the track to Iizuka was designated the Chikuho Main Line while the track from Iizuka to Nagao was designated the Nagao Line. On 7 December 1929, both lines were merged and the station became part of the Chikuho Main Line. On 1 December 1940, the station was renamed Keizen. With the privatization of Japanese National Railways (JNR), the successor of JGR, on 1 April 1987, control of the station passed to JR Kyushu.

Station numbering was introduced on 28 September 2018 with Keisen being assigned station number JC10 for the Fukuhoku Yutaka Line and JG04 for the Haruda Line.

Passenger statistics
In fiscal 2016, the station was used by an average of 1,881 passengers daily (boarding passengers only), and it ranked 97th among the busiest stations of JR Kyushu.

See also
The following stations have the same name in Kanji but have different readings and hence are written differently in Hiragana and when transliterated:
Katsuragawa Station (Hokkaidō)
Katsuragawa Station (Kyoto)

References

External links
Station information (JR Kyūshū)

Railway stations in Fukuoka Prefecture
Railway stations in Japan opened in 1901